The Joint Typhoon Warning Center (JTWC) is a joint United States Navy – United States Air Force command in Pearl Harbor, Hawaii. The JTWC is responsible for the issuing of tropical cyclone warnings in the North-West Pacific Ocean, South Pacific Ocean, and Indian Ocean for all branches of the U.S. Department of Defense and other U.S. government agencies. Their warnings are intended for the protection of primarily military ships and aircraft as well as military installations jointly operated with other countries around the world.

Its U.S. Navy components are aligned with the Naval Meteorology and Oceanography Command.

History

The origins of the Joint Typhoon Warning Center (JTWC) can be traced back to June 1945, when the Fleet Weather Center/Typhoon Tracking Center was established on the island of Guam, after multiple typhoons, including Typhoon Cobra of December 1944 and Typhoon Connie in June 1945, had caused a significant loss of men and ships. At this time the center was one of three Navy and two Air Force units responsible for tropical cyclone reconnaissance and warnings in the Pacific. Over the next few years the coordination of tropical warnings between the centers was at times difficult or impossible due to various communication problems. During 1958, the United States Department of Defense weather services and the Weather Bureau formed the Joint Meteorology Committee to the Pacific Command and proposed the formation of a joint Navy and Air Force center for typhoon analysis and forecasting. A committee was subsequently set up to study the issue which issued a report during January 1959, which gave recommendation that the center be set up. Based on the report and the conclusions reached at the March 1959 Annual Tropical Cyclone Conference, the Joint Meteorology Committee formally urged, The Commander in Chief, US Pacific Command (CINCPAC) to establish a Joint Typhoon Warning Center. The CINCPAC subsequently petitioned the Joint Chiefs of Staff, who gave permission for the center to be set up effective May 1, 1959, under the command of the Fleet Weather Center's commander.

The JTWC initially consisted of ten people with two officers and three enlisted personnel provided by each service. It was required to provide warnings on all tropical cyclones between the Malay Peninsula and the International Dateline for US government agencies. They also had to determine reconnaissance requirements, prepare annual typhoon summaries, and conduct research into tropical cyclone forecasting and detection. In November 1962, Typhoon Karen destroyed the building housing the Fleet Weather Center/Joint Typhoon Warning Center. It relocated in a more typhoon-proof building in 1965. Between 1971 and 1976, CINCPAC gradually expanded out the JTWC's area of responsibility, to include the area between the International Dateline and the African coasts. In October 1978, the Fleet Weather Center/JTWC became the Navy Oceanographic Command Center/Joint Typhoon Warning Center and responsible for the whole oceanic environment, from the bottom of the ocean to the top of the atmosphere. The JTWC subsequently started issuing warnings for the Southern Hemisphere between the African coast and the International Dateline during October 1980. It was relocated to Pearl Harbor on January 1, 1999, due to the 1995 Base Realignment and Closure Commission round. During October 2011, the JTWC's name changed from the “Naval Maritime Forecast Center/Joint Typhoon Warning Center” to just the Joint Typhoon Warning Center, as it became a stand-alone command for the first time in its 52-year history.

Standards and practices

A more modernized method for forecasting tropical cyclones had become apparent by the 1980s. Prior to the development of ATCF, the tools used by the Department of Defense to forecast tropical cyclone track were acetate, grease pencils, and disparate computer programs. The ATCF software was developed by the Naval Research Laboratory for the JTWC beginning in 1986, and used since 1988.  It was adapted for use at the National Hurricane Center (NHC) in 1990.

JTWC adheres to the World Meteorological Organization's (WMO) rules for storm names and adheres to acknowledged guidelines for intensity of tropical cyclones and tropical storms, with the exception of using the U.S. standard of measuring sustained winds for 1-min instead of the 10-min span recommended by the WMO (see Saffir-Simpson Hurricane Scale). The JTWC is not one of the WMO designated Regional Specialized Meteorological Centres, nor one of its Tropical cyclone warning centers, as its main mission is to support the United States government agencies. JTWC monitors, analyzes, and forecasts tropical cyclone formation, development, and movement year round. Its area of responsibility covers 89% of the world's tropical cyclone activity.

Staffing
The center is manned by about 37 U.S. Air Force and Navy personnel. The JTWC uses several satellite systems and sensors, radar, surface and upper level synoptic data as well as atmospheric models to complete its mission.

See also

Invest (meteorology)
 Pacific hurricane season
 Pacific typhoon season
 North Indian Ocean cyclone season
[[{{#ifexpr:>6|–|–}} South-West Indian Ocean cyclone season]]
[[{{#ifexpr:>6|–|–}} Australian region cyclone season]]
[[{{#ifexpr:>6|–|–}} South Pacific cyclone season]]

References

External links
 

United States Department of Defense agencies
Military units and formations of the United States Navy
Tropical cyclone meteorology
1959 establishments in the United States
Governmental meteorological agencies in North America